The Caesar Park Taipei is a five-star luxury hotel in Zhongzheng District, Taipei, Taiwan. Opened on July 15, 1973 as Hilton Taipei, the hotel has 478 rooms in 6 types and suites and an exercise room, a spa and a rooftop garden. Banquet facilities and a business center are available. The 1st and B1 floors house Caesars Mall Food Court. Foreign celebrities who have visited include American movie star Elizabeth Taylor, former U.S. President Bill Clinton (while governor), American singers Tom Jones and Tina Turner and others.

History
Located directly opposite the Taipei Main Station, Caesar Park Taipei was originally a sightseeing hotel invested by Huayang Development. It started construction in 1970. In 1972, it signed a management technology cooperation contract with Hilton Hotels & Resorts. When completed in September 1972, it was handed over to Hilton to operate and renamed as the Hilton Taipei. It was the tallest building in Taiwan and held the title for a year until being surpassed by Grand Hotel (Taipei) on October 10, 1973. In July 1988, Guoyu Development purchased the hotel and renewed the cooperation contract with Hilton. On December 31, 2002, the cooperation contract between Guoyu Development and Hilton ended, and on January 1, 2003, the name was changed to Caesar Park Taipei. During the 2021 COVID-19 pandemic outbreak in Taiwan, Caesar Park Taipei were among the first hotels in Taipei to announce that it would be temporarily closed in order to be transformed into a "specialized hotel for epidemic prevention", a Taiwanese version of Fangcang hospital.

Restaurants & Bars 
 Checkers Buffet: Buffet offering cuisines from around the globe, with a view of Taipei Main Station.
 Dynasty: Chinese restaurant featuring traditional authentic Cantonese cuisine, including dim sum.

Gallery

See also
 Caesar Metro Taipei
 Caesar Park Hotel Banqiao
 Mandarin Oriental, Taipei
 The Landis Taipei

References

External links
Caesar Park Taipei Official Website 

1972 establishments in Taiwan
Hotels in Taipei
Hotel buildings completed in 1972